This is a list of members of the Australian House of Representatives from 1977 to 1980, as elected at the 1977 federal election:

1 Labor member Gough Whitlam resigned on 31 July 1978; Labor candidate John Kerin won the resulting by-election on 23 September 1978.
2 Labor member Frank Stewart died on 16 April 1979; Labor candidate Leo McLeay won the resulting by-election on 23 June 1979.

References

Members of Australian parliaments by term
20th-century Australian politicians